Skysaw was an American alternative rock band featuring former The Smashing Pumpkins drummer Jimmy Chamberlin along with multi-instrumentalist/vocalist/songwriter Mike Reina and guitarist Anthony Pirog.

History
Formed in 2009, alternative rock band Skysaw featured Jimmy Chamberlin along with Mike Reina and Anthony Pirog. Reina and Pirog fronted a Washington DC-based psych-pop ensemble called The Jackfields. Reina was introduced first to Chamberlin through a mutual acquaintance, and through him, Pirog. The band name is a reference to the song "Sky Saw", the opening track of Brian Eno's album Another Green World.

The band released its debut full-length album, Great Civilizations, in June 2011.

The band performed live in 2011 with additional touring members, multi-instrumentalist/vocalist Boris Skalsky and guitarist Paul Wood, both of Dead Heart Bloom.

On August 23, 2012 Jimmy Chamberlin revealed the dissolution of Skysaw.

Great Civilizations

Great Civilizations is the only album by the American band Skysaw, released on June 21, 2011.

Track listing

Personnel
Skysaw
Mike Reina — vocals; synthesizer (tracks 1-4, 6-10), Mellotron (tracks 1, 2, 5, 6, 8), piano (tracks 2, 3, 5-10), bass (tracks 1-3, 5, 7-10), guitar (tracks 1, 2, 4, 6, 9)
Anthony Pirog — guitar; synthesizer (tracks 1, 3, 4, 7, 9, 10), percussion (tracks 2, 8, 10), bass (tracks 4, 8)
Jimmy Chamberlin — drums, percussion
Additional Personnel
Rebecca Steele — cello (track 5)
Janel Leppin — strings (track 5)
Heather MacArthur — viola (track 5)
Cheryl Pearson — violin (track 5)
Drew Morris — backing vocals (track 9)

References

External links
 
 
 Washington Post Interview from 2011

American alternative rock groups
American progressive rock groups
Neo-psychedelia groups
Musical groups established in 2009
Dangerbird Records artists